Sur Carungas is a mountain of the Oberhalbstein Alps, located between Ausserferrera and Savognin in the Swiss canton of Graubünden. It lies on the range separating the valleys of Ferrera (west) and Sursés (east), south of Piz Curvér.

References

External links
 Sur Carungas on Hikr

Mountains of the Alps
Mountains of Graubünden
Mountains of Switzerland
Two-thousanders of Switzerland